Oreoleuciscus potanini is a species of cyprinid in the genus Oreoleuciscus. It inhabits Mongolia and Tuva, Russia, in freshwater rivers and lakes with temperatures of between 10 and 20 Celsius (50 and 68 Fahrenheit). It is considered harmless to humans.

References

Cyprinid fish of Asia
Fish of Mongolia
Fish of Russia
Cyprinidae